The Ministry of Justice, Internal Administration and Human Rights of São Tomé and Príncipe has certain responsibilities such as overseeing the São Tomé and Príncipe land registry, property registry, and prison system.

List of ministers (Post-1975 upon achieving independence) 

 Manuel Quaresma Costa (1975-1976)
 Jose Fret (1976-1977)
 Celestino da Rocha Costa (1977-1983)
 Manuel Vaz Afonso Fernandes (1983-1985)
 Francisco Fortunado Pires (1985-1990)
 Olegario Pires Tiny (1991-1994)
 Manuel Vas Afonso Fernandes (1995-1996)
 Amaro Pereira De Couto (1997-1999)
 Alberto Paulino (1999-2002)
 Justino Tavares Viegas (2002-2013)
 Edite Ramos da Costa Ten Jua (2013-2016) [1st female]
 Ilza dos Santos Amado Vaz (2016-2018)
 Ivete Santos Lima Correia (2018-2022)
 Cilcio dos Santos (2022–present)

See also 
 Justice ministry
 Politics of São Tomé and Príncipe

References 

Justice ministries
Government of São Tomé and Príncipe